Rodwell, a name of Old English origin, is a locational surname deriving from any one of various places in Bedfordshire, Hertfordshire, and Kent, England.In English, the meaning of the name Rodwell is "lives by the spring near the road". There are places in Bedfordshire and Hertfordshire called Radwell, and both are recorded in the Domesday Book of 1086 as "Radeuuelle"; the name means "the red spring or stream", derived from the Olde English pre-7th-century "read", red, with "well(a)", spring or stream. Rodwell, a parish in the diocese of Rochester, Kent, derives its name from the Olde English personal name "Hroda", a short form of various compound names with the first element "hrod", renown, with "well(a)", as before.

The modern surname from this source can be found as Rodwell, Radwell, and Rudwell. The christening of Hugh, son of John Rodwell, was recorded at St. Michael Bassishaw, London on July 27, 1572, and the marriage of Thomas Rodwell and Hanna Francknet was recorded in Eaton Socon, Bedfordshire, on October 27, 1624. The first recorded spelling of the family name is that of Robert de Radewell, dated 1273, in the "Hundred Rolls of Bedfordshire".

Surname

Rodwell is mostly used as a surname. Notable people with such include:

 Benjamin Rodwell, British lawyer and Conservative politician 
 Brett Rodwell, Australian rugby league footballer
 Cecil Hunter-Rodwell, British colonial administrator and Governor 
 Charles Rodwell (born 1996), British-born French politician 
Craig Rodwell, American gay rights activist and founder of the first gay bookstore
Emerson Rodwell, Australian soldier, cricket player, umpire, commentator and administrator
 Eric Rodwell, American bridge player
 George Herbert Buonaparte Rodwell, English composer, musical director, and author.
 Jack Rodwell, English footballer
 James Rodwell, English rugby union sevens player
 Jim Rodwell, English footballer and former chairman of Boston United
 John Medows Rodwell, English translator of the Koran
 John S. Rodwell, British ecologist based at the University of Lancaster
 Lindy Rodwell, South African zoologist and conservationist 
Matt Rodwell, Australian rugby league footballer
Roger de Rodwell, English medieval university chancellor
Sally Rodwell (1950 – 2006), New Zealand multi-disciplinary artist 
Tony Rodwell, English soccer footballer
Warren Rodwell, former soldier, university teacher, hostage survivor and songwriter 
Warwick Rodwell, English author, archaeologist, architectural historian and academic

In fiction

Rodwell has been used a character name in literature and television. For example:

 Andrew Rodwell, a fictional character from the Australia soap opera Neighbours
 Michael Marlon Rodwell, a former convict in Coronation Street played by Les Dennis
Gail Rodwell, a fictional character from the soap opera Coronation Street
 Lord Rodwell Stark, a former Lord of Winterfell in American TV series Game of Thrones
 Michael Rodwell, a fictional character from the soap opera Coronation Street
 Sadie Rodwell, a fictional character from the Australia soap opera Neighbours
 Wendy Rodwell, a fictional character from the Australia soap opera Neighbours

Hyphenated name

Verna L. Jones-Rodwell, American politician
Caitlin O'Connell-Rodwell American scientific consultant, author, co-founder and CEO of Utopia Scientific, elephant expert

First name

 Rodwell Ferguson, Belizean politician
 Rodwell Makoto, Zimbabwean chess international master
 Rodwell Munyenyembe, Malawi politician
 Rodwell Williams, Belizean lawyer

See also
 Rodwell, California, US
 Rodwell Trail, Weymouth Dorset, England 
 Rodwell Railway Station, Dorset, England

References